Brian Edgar Huggins (30 August 1931 – 29 March 2013) was a British-Canadian journalist and actor.

Biography 
Huggins was born on 30 August 1931 in Leicester, Leicestershire, England, where he was also raised. He started his career in journalism in England, before moving to Canada at age 25. After arriving in Canada he worked for The Newspaper Guild in Montreal, and as a journalist with the CBC in Toronto. He was the candidate in the 1963 general elections for the New Democratic Party of Canada in the riding of Ottawa West. In the 1970s he was a broadcast journalist for CBC Ottawa; lived in Paris (1974-75) where he was a freelance writer; and returned to Ottawa where he worked as a Member's Secretary on Parliament Hill, before he joined the Civil Service to work in public relations, a writer and editor for Statistics Canada. He also worked for the Canadian Union of Public Employees.

Following his retirement from journalism and the public service, he took up acting. As a background or character actor he played many small roles in both television and movies filmed for the most part on the East Coast. He is best known for his portrayal of "Shitty" Bill in the hit Canadian mockumentary series Trailer Park Boys.

Personal life 
Born to parents Beatrice Pye and Charles Huggins, Huggins was raised in Leicester. Huggins later moved to London to pursue his career in journalism which he had started at the Leicester Evening Mail.  After emigrating to Canada, Huggins lived in Montreal, Toronto, and Ottawa. He married Catherine Costello (1943-1983), with whom he had two children, son Paul (b.1967 Montréal) and daughter Piper (b.1969 Ottawa). Once retired he moved to Nova Scotia, where he divided his time between Chester and Dartmouth. He also spent a good part of the year in his native England, latter settling in Hailsham, South of London.

Huggins was a member of the Ottawa Press Club, Canadian Union of Public Employees, Royal St George's Society of Halifax, Chester Yacht Club, Royal Over-Seas League, Alliance of Canadian Cinema, Television and Radio Artists, and the New Democratic Party.

Death 
Huggins died on 29 March 2013 in Dartmouth, Nova Scotia, Canada.

References

External links 

1931 births
2013 deaths
English emigrants to Canada
English male television actors
Canadian male television actors
People from Dartmouth, Nova Scotia
Journalists from Nova Scotia
Journalists from Toronto
Journalists from Quebec
People from Leicester
Male actors from Halifax, Nova Scotia
Male actors from Montreal
Male actors from Ottawa
Male actors from Toronto
Male actors from Leicestershire